Simon Ferguson (born April 6, 1983) is a Canadian former professional ice hockey forward who played in the American Hockey League (AHL). He spent his last two seasons abroad in Europe before retiring after the 2012–13 season with the Sheffield Steelers in the Elite Ice Hockey League (EIHL). He is currently the head coach of minor junior team, the Okanagan Rockets in the BCMML.

Career statistics

References

External links

1983 births
Living people
Augusta Lynx players
Canadian ice hockey right wingers
Edmonton Road Runners players
EfB Ishockey players
HDD Olimpija Ljubljana players
Hershey Bears players
Lethbridge Hurricanes players
Kelowna Rockets players
Greenville Grrrowl players
Portland Pirates players
San Antonio Rampage players
Sheffield Steelers players
Syracuse Crunch players
Utah Grizzlies (ECHL) players
Canadian expatriate ice hockey players in England
Canadian expatriate ice hockey players in Slovenia
Canadian expatriate ice hockey players in Denmark